Rose is a 2012 British thriller film directed by Kemal Yildirim. The film premiered on 15 May 2012 at the London Independent Film Festival and was released on DVD on 20 May 2014 in the United States with other territories to follow.

The film stars Helen Clifford as Rose, a drug addict and prostitute trying to raise her daughter Ellie, and is based upon Yildirim's 2008 short film by the same name, which screened at Cannes, and resulted in his being encouraged to expand the short into a feature film.

Plot

Cast

 Helen Clifford as Rose
 Mike Mitchell as Blondie
 Patrick Regis as Tony
 Chelsea Impey (as Chelsea Alcock) as Ellie
 Lucy White as Magdalena
 Eileen Daly as Yondra
 Gary Cross as Filthy Mick
 Ryan Hunter (as Rami Hilmi) as Baldo
 Elaine Hartley as Rebs
 Gemma Crabtree as Jols
 Geneveive Cleghorn as Laine
 Caroline Nash as Susan
 Kemal Yildirim as Lead Chancer  
 Jack James as Pete the Perv

Accolades

References

External links
 
 
Rose (2012) FromPage2Screen, 16 April 2014
Rose - Trailer YouTube
Rose (2012) Unsung Films talk Rose, 28 November 2013

2012 films
2012 crime thriller films
2012 independent films
2010s exploitation films
2012 psychological thriller films
British crime thriller films
British exploitation films
2010s feminist films
Features based on short films
2012 directorial debut films
British independent films
2010s English-language films
2010s British films